Pseudatemelia langohri is a moth of the family Oecophoridae. It was described by Palm in 1990. It is found in France.

References

Moths described in 1990
Amphisbatinae
Moths of Europe